The 1984 World Badminton Grand Prix was the second edition of the World Badminton Grand Prix finals. It was held in Kuala Lumpur, Malaysia, from December 12 to December 16, 1984.

Results

Third place

Finals

References
Smash: World Grand Prix Finals, Kuala Lumpur 1984

B
World Grand Prix
World Badminton Grand Prix
Badminton tournaments in Malaysia
Sport in Kuala Lumpur
1984 in Malaysian sport